Mathew Bodie (born March 7, 1990) is a Canadian professional ice hockey defenceman who is currently playing for ERC Ingolstadt of the Deutsche Eishockey Liga (DEL).

Playing career
As a member of the Winnipeg Thrashers midget hockey team, he was named the Most Valuable player and top defenceman at the 2008 Telus Cup. The Thrashers captured the silver medal.

Bodie played collegiate hockey for the Union Dutchmen in the NCAA Men's Division I ECAC Hockey conference. In his sophomore year, Bodie's outstanding play was recognized when he was selected to the 2011–12 ECAC Hockey First Team.

Undrafted, Bodie was signed by the New York Rangers to a one-year entry-level contract on April 15, 2014, after Union won the NCAA Championship.

On April 20, 2016, Bodie was recalled by the New York Rangers from the team's AHL affiliate, the Hartford Wolf Pack, but he did not play for the team.

During the 2016–17 season, while captaining the Wolf Pack, Bodie was dealt by the Rangers at the trade deadline to the Buffalo Sabres in exchange for Daniel Catenacci on February 28, 2017. He played out the season in the AHL with the Rochester Americans, producing 9 points in 17 games.

On July 1, 2017, Bodie as a free agent signed to a one-year, two-way contract with the Tampa Bay Lightning. After attending the Lightning's 2017 training camp, he was assigned to AHL affiliate, the Syracuse Crunch for the duration of the 2017–18 season. Assuming a role as the Crunch's top pairing defenseman, Bodie responded with a professional high 31 assists and 37 points in 74 games.

As a free agent from the Lightning, Bodie opted to halt his North American career, agreeing to an initial one-year deal with Russian club, Torpedo Nizhny Novgorod of the Kontinental Hockey League (KHL) on July 20, 2018. In his debut season in Russia in 2018–19, Bodie recorded 3 goals and 16 points in 39 games from the blueline with Torpedo.

On June 14, 2019, Bodie as a free agent opted to sign in Sweden, agreeing to a one-year contract with the Växjö Lakers of the Swedish Hockey League (SHL). Mid-way into the 2019–20 season, Bodie collected 1 goal and 3 points in 17 games with Växjö, before he transferred to fellow SHL outfit, IK Oskarshamn, for the remainder of the campaign on November 25, 2019. Bodie in an increased role with Oskarshamn, boosted his offensive totals with 1 goal and 10 points in 27 regular season games.

As a free agent from IK Oskarshamn, Bodie extended his European career in agreeing to a one-year contract with German club, ERC Ingolstadt of the DEL, on November 12, 2020.

Career statistics

Awards and honours

References

External links

1990 births
Canadian expatriate ice hockey players in Sweden
Canadian ice hockey defencemen
ERC Ingolstadt players
Hartford Wolf Pack players
Ice hockey people from Manitoba
IK Oskarshamn players
Living people
Powell River Kings players
Rochester Americans players
Syracuse Crunch players
Torpedo Nizhny Novgorod players
Union Dutchmen ice hockey players
Växjö Lakers players
AHCA Division I men's ice hockey All-Americans